Brian and Ed Krassenstein are American twin brothers who are writers, entrepreneurs, and social media personalities. They reside in Fort Myers, Florida and graduated from Rutgers University in 2004 with degrees in economics. They gained fame during the presidency of Donald Trump by replying to Trump's Twitter account very often. The Krassensteins were suspended from Twitter in 2019 for allegedly operating fake accounts. They denied these allegations. In December 2022, their accounts were reinstated.

Early life

The Krassensteins were born and raised in Somers Point, New Jersey. They graduated from Mainland Regional High School in 2000. According to Brian, they launched their first business at the age of 15, selling baseball cards on the internet, before moving onto running Internet forums in the early 2000s. In college, they started a business running online communities addressing topics such as video games, automobiles, and investing.

Business ventures

Investing forums 
Beginning in 2003 or earlier, the Krassensteins began operating web forums such as TalkGold and MoneyMakerGroup. In August 2017, Homeland Security Special Agent Michael Adams of the United States Department of Justice alleged that these websites were devoted to the promotion of high-yield investment programs (HYIPs), which the U.S. Securities and Exchange Commission describes as being “unregistered investments typically run by unlicensed individuals — and they are often frauds.”  The brothers wrote on Web-Life, one of their sites, that they ran "the ONLY safelist for HYIP".

The United States Department of Justice (DOJ) raided the Krassenstein brothers' homes and web site operations in 2017, pulling TalkGold and MoneyMakerGroup offline on or around August 22. In a civil asset forfeiture complaint, the DOJ accused the Krassensteins of obtaining property that was considered to be "traceable to proceeds of wire fraud." Investigators temporarily seized their phones and internet devices, and later seized their homes, a rental property and other investments. Adams claimed that the Krassensteins were paid huge sums of money by individuals engaged in illegal activities, and that they knew that the funds had been criminally derived. Ed Krassenstein denied any wrongdoing and said that he and his brother only sold advertising space to companies that they did not know to be fraudulent. He told The Daily Beast that he and his brother were not promoting anything and that the purpose of their websites was "to help people find out which online business opportunities were legitimate and which were not."

The brothers were never arrested or charged with a crime. The federal investigators later explained that the Krassensteins' websites allowed for the publication of ads for companies that were scams, and that a criminal organization from Russia was allegedly behind the ads. The DOJ investigated whether the brothers were actively involved in what the department described as Ponzi schemes.

The Krassensteins settled their case with the federal government. They consented to asset forfeiture of about $450,000 from the sale of a rental property. On their own Independent Reporter web site, the Krassensteins wrote that the U.S. government had offered them a settlement that would have compelled them to testify against members of an "international organized crime syndicate". They rejected that deal out of concerns for their own safety.

3DPrint.com 
The Krassensteins co-founded 3DPrint.com, a 3D printing and additive manufacturing resource, together in December 2013. In October 2014, the business received an equity investment from Sagamore LLC, and in September 2015, the Krassensteins sold the business to MecklerMedia in conjunction with New York based Sagamore III LLC.  The sale included a 25% equity stake in another website the brothers ran, 3DPrintBoard.  The Krassensteins remained involved with 3DPrint as the directors of ad sales after the site was acquired.

Hill Reporter 
In 2018, the Krassensteins, along with James Kosur, co-founded Hill Reporter, an online political news portal.  They sold the website to Roman Romanuk, an ad tech businessman, in 2019.

NFTz 
In August 2021, the Krassensteins, along with Martijn van Halen, Wouter van Halen, and Bas van Halen, co-founded NFTz.me, an NFT marketplace and community built on the DeSo blockchain. NFTz received funding from the DeSo Foundation's Octane Fund.

The Krassensteins purchased the first NFT created by Tiffany Trump, Donald's daughter. She then bought an NFT that the brothers created.

Twitter

The Krassenstein brothers became well-known as 
Resistance Twitter activists
protesting the presidency of Donald Trump by frequently responding to Trump's 
tweets. Mother Jones magazine listed them first in an article on "some notable resistance hucksters". "They were an insufferable pair, and Twitter is better off without them," said Joe Berkowitz, a writer for Fast Company, in an article about a parody of the brothers.  They were followed by members of US Congress like Eric Swalwell, Ayanna Pressley, Amy Klobuchar and Cory Booker, and political commentators such Van Jones and Megyn Kelly.

After President Trump blocked the Krassensteins on Twitter, their names were added to a lawsuit filed by Knight First Amendment Institute against the President.  The lawsuit alleged that Trump's Twitter account constituted a public forum, and that blocking access to it was a violation of their First Amendment rights. In August 2018, months after a federal judge had ruled on the matter, President Trump quietly unblocked the Krassensteins and many other critics.

In 2018, Brian raised $12,083 for former FBI deputy director Andrew McCabe’s legal defense fund by tweeting a link to a GoFundMe campaign. "I just want to take a minute to thank each and every member of the DOJ and FBI who have come under attack by our President," tweeted Brian, who raised more money for the campaign than any other social media user did.

In May 2019, Twitter suspended both brothers' accounts.  Social Blade estimated that Ed had 925,802 followers 
and Brian had 698,039 
at the time the accounts were suspended. 
Ed told The Daily Beast that he started his Twitter account as a Justin Bieber fan 
account before renaming it after himself, explaining his higher follower 
count than his brother's account. Twitter suspended both accounts indefinitely, alleging the use of fake 
accounts in a way that violated Twitter's terms of use. Brian and Ed used their Facebook accounts to protest their respective bans from Twitter, demanding that Twitter provide evidence or reinstate their accounts.

The brothers told reporters that following their Twitter bans, they were contacted by pro-Trump conspiracy theorist Jacob Wohl, who himself was banned from Twitter. Wohl reportedly suggested that he and the Krassensteins should band together to fight Internet censorship. Wohl, on his personal Instagram account, said that he bought fake followers to get the Krassensteins banned from Twitter.

After Twitter banned Brian and Ed, Brian's wife Heidi joined Twitter as "Mrs. Krassenstein". Despite speculation that her account was a front for Brian or Ed, Heidi told The Daily Beast that she was running the account herself. Heidi quit Twitter in November 2020, following the general projection of Joe Biden as the winner of the presidential election.

In December 2022, after Elon Musk took over, several former Twitter employees who quit the company after Musk's takeover, encouraged the Krassensteins to email Ella Irwin, Musk's new head of Trust and Safety to see about getting their accounts back.  Within an hour they had their accounts reinstated, according to Brian.

Writing

The Krassensteins wrote extensively for their own web site, 3DPrint, between December 2013 and September 2015.  They did the same for Hill Reporter in 2018 and 2019.

In August 2018, the Krassensteins published a parody book, mocking the Trump family, titled 
How the People Trumped Ronald Plump. Initially they had attempted to crowdfund the book as a children's book in 2017, but their Kickstarter campaign raised just 42% of its goal. The book itself 
received mixed reviews. Many Twitter users and several journalists criticized Benny Rahdiana’s illustrations of characters such as Ronald Plump (designed to resemble Donald Trump), Weave Bannon (Steve Bannon), Loudimir Tootin (Vladimir Putin), and Robert Moral (Robert Mueller). Before the book was published, critics found fault with its depictions of Mueller, as a shirtless superhero, and of a woman resembling Elizabeth Warren being carried in a burlap sack. The Washington Free Beacon referred to the book as a “widely celebrated children's book.” The brothers responded to criticisms of Mueller's depiction by posting numerous illustrations of shirtless superheroes and also a shirtless photo of themselves, which The Daily Dot referred to as “topless selfies”.

In October 2018, the Krassensteins were the first to report on a smear campaign alleging sexual assault against special counsel Robert Mueller. The scheme was perpetrated by political operative Jacob Wohl and radio host Jack Burkman. The Krassensteins also tipped off Mueller about the allegations, and Mueller referred the scheme to the FBI for investigation. The Krassensteins connected Wohl to a company called Surefire Intelligence, which allegedly perpetrated the scheme and which allegedly made a threatening phone call to the Krassensteins.

The Krassensteins were both contributors for The Independent, writing several op-ed pieces for the publication in 2019.

In November 2019, the Krassensteins published an article based on a months-long investigation into an alleged smear campaign directed at Congresswoman Ilhan Omar. The Krassensteins' report stated that the operation was being perpetrated by two different countries — the United Arab Emirates and Saudi Arabia — as well as multiple prominent GOP figures.  They also correctly predicted that a man named Abdullah Al-Saleh would emerge as a witness in the scheme.

In 2020, the Krassensteins used a Medium blog to publish a series of articles about Tara Reade, who had made sexual assault allegations against then-presidential candidate Joe Biden. The articles dove into the question of whether Reade had once written a blog post that was translated into Russian, suggested that her story was inconsistent and showed that Reade had praised Biden for his actions in helping stop sexual assault on multiple occasions. Journalist Claire Goforth of The Daily Dot wrote that the articles were meant to discredit Reade's allegations. They were spread widely by Biden's supporters.

Media appearances

On December 12, 2018, Vice News Tonight included a segment on Brian and Ed Krassenstein entitled "Meet the Krassensteins, the superstar bros of #Resistance Twitter." The segment followed the brothers on the day that former Trump attorney Michael Cohen was sentenced to prison.

The Krassensteins played themselves in several episodes of a A Fowl American, an animated series of web shorts by actor Greg Cipes and Kevin Coulston.

From January to September 2019, the brothers hosted KrassenCast: Defending What's Left, a podcast about political news. Guests on their show included 2020 presidential candidates Andrew Yang, Marianne Williamson, and Seth Moulton; 2020 Senate candidate Jaime Harrison; and U.S. Representative Ro Khanna.

References

External links
 Brian's official web site
 Ed's official web site

American mass media company founders
2010s in Internet culture
Twitter accounts
American children's writers
Brother duos
Rutgers University alumni
Writers from Florida
Businesspeople from Florida